Stuart Craig Lowe (July 18, 1957 – January 14, 2023) was an American politician who served as Mayor of Gainesville, Florida, from 2010 to 2013; he previously served as Gainesville City Commissioner from 2003 through his becoming mayor. Lowe was the first openly gay mayor of the city.

Lowe was first elected to the Gainesville City Commission to fill the newly created District 4 seat for a one-year term in April 2003 and consecutively to two full (3-year) terms until being sworn in as mayor.

After winning a runoff election on April 13, 2010, by a margin of 42 votes (which held through an automatic recount) Lowe became mayor-elect of Gainesville. He was sworn in on May 20, 2010. He lost his bid for re-election on April 16, 2013, to former City Commissioner Ed Braddy after being arrested for a DUI during the campaign.

Lowe also served as Chair of the Gainesville City Commission’s Equal Opportunity Committee, a member of the Regional Utilities, Community Development, and Countywide Visioning & Planning committees as well as the local Community Redevelopment Agency, the Gainesville/Alachua County Metropolitan Transportation Planning Organization and the Alachua County Library Governing Board.

Lowe was a member of the Mayors Against Illegal Guns Coalition, an organization formed in 2006 and co-chaired by New York City Mayor Michael Bloomberg and Boston Mayor Thomas Menino.

Personal life and education
Lowe was born and raised in Atlanta, Georgia. He received a B.S.A. degree in Soil Science from the University of Georgia. After moving to Gainesville in 1982 he received a master's degree in zoology from the University of Florida.

Lowe died in Gainesville on January 14, 2023, at the age of 65.

Electoral history

2003

2004
Commissioner Lowe ran for re-election unopposed in 2004.

2007

2010

Runoff Recount
A runoff election was held on April 13, 2010, with Lowe and Marsh as the candidates. The unofficial results indicated that Lowe had 6,098 votes (50.14%) and Marsh 6,063 votes (49.86%), excluding provisional ballots.  Ultimately 17 provisional ballots were verified, yielding 12 more votes for Lowe and 5 more for Marsh. As the margin was less than 0.50% between the candidates, an automatic machine recount took place on April 16, 2010. The recount verified the unofficial results, including verified provisional ballots, leaving the vote tallies unchanged. These are the official, certified results of the election.

2013

2013 DUI Arrest

Prior to the runoff election on April 16, 2013, Lowe was arrested on suspicion of driving under the influence (DUI). The incident took place on March 21, 2013 when Lowe was involved in a single car crash. On April 1, 2013, Lowe entered into a deferred prosecution agreement aimed at first-time DUI offenders to resolve the charges against him.

References

External links 
 Mayor Lowe's City of Gainesville 

1957 births
2023 deaths
21st-century LGBT people
Mayors of Gainesville, Florida
Politicians from Atlanta
University of Georgia alumni
University of Florida alumni
Florida Democrats
Gay politicians
LGBT mayors of places in the United States
LGBT people from Florida
LGBT people from Georgia (U.S. state)